This is a list of moths of the family Gelechiidae that are found in South Africa. It also acts as an index to the species articles and forms part of the full List of moths of South Africa.

Acraeologa delotypa Janse, 1963
Acraeologa xanthobasalis Janse, 1963
Acraeologa xerochroa Meyrick, 1921
Acribologa cymotrocha (Meyrick, 1913)
Acutitornus kalahariensis Janse, 1957
Acutitornus leucostola Janse, 1957
Acutitornus liebbergi Janse, 1963
Acutitornus munda Janse, 1951
Acutitornus munroi Janse, 1957
Aeolotrocha delograpta Janse, 1960
Aeolotrocha generosa Meyrick, 1921
Aeolotrocha paroptila Janse, 1960
Aeolotrocha phaeoptera Janse, 1960
Allophlebia hemizancla Janse, 1960
Amblyphylla lophozancla Janse, 1960
Anacampsis cosmia Meyrick, 1921
Anacampsis embrocha Meyrick, 1914
Anapatetris crystallista (Meyrick, 1911)
Anarsia agricola Walsingham, 1891
Anarsia albibasella Janse, 1963
Anarsia amalleuta Meyrick, 1913
Anarsia antisaris (Meyrick, 1913)
Anarsia callicosma Janse, 1960
Anarsia carbonaria Meyrick, 1913
Anarsia gravata Meyrick, 1911
Anarsia inculta Walsingham, 1891
Anarsia mitescens Meyrick, 1913
Anarsia nigrimacula Janse, 1949
Anarsia nimbosa Meyrick, 1913
Anarsia permissa Meyrick, 1926
Anarsia pustulata Janse, 1949
Anarsia sciograpta (Meyrick, 1921)
Anarsia sciotona Meyrick, 1927
Anarsia spicata Meyrick, 1918
Anarsia subfulvescens Meyrick, 1918
Anarsia vectaria Meyrick, 1918
Anastomopteryx angulata Janse, 1951
Angustiphylla hylotropa Janse, 1960
Anomologa demens Meyrick, 1926
Anomologa dispulsa Meyrick, 1926
Aproaerema africanella (Janse, 1951)
Araeophalla barbertonensis Janse, 1960
Araeovalva albiflora (Meyrick, 1920)
Araeovalva minor Janse, 1960
Argophara epaxia Janse, 1963
Aristotelia balanocentra Meyrick, 1914
Aristotelia chlorographa Meyrick, 1914
Aristotelia comis Meyrick, 1913
Aristotelia dryonota Meyrick, 1926
Aristotelia galeotis Meyrick, 1908
Aristotelia ptilastis Meyrick, 1909
Aristotelia swierstrai Janse, 1950
Aristotelia trematias Meyrick, 1913
Asapharcha strigifera Meyrick, 1920
Aspades armatovalva Janse, 1963
Aspades hutchinsonella (Walsingham, 1891)
Athrips cretulata Meyrick, 1927
Athrips helicaula (Meyrick, 1912)
Athrips mappigera Meyrick, 1914
Athrips neograpta Meyrick, 1914
Athrips phoenaula (Meyrick, 1913)
Athrips ptychophora (Meyrick, 1914)
Athrips syncopaula (Meyrick, 1937)
Athrips zetterstedtiella (Zeller, 1852)
Autodectis atelarga Meyrick, 1937
Belovalva nigripuncta Janse, 1963
Bilobata argosticha (Janse, 1954)
Bilobata subsecivella (Zeller, 1852)
Bilobata torninotella (Janse, 1954)
Blastovalva anisochroa Janse, 1960
Blastovalva haplotypa Janse, 1960
Blastovalva paltobola (Meyrick, 1921)
Brachmia apricata Meyrick, 1913
Brachmia convolvuli Walsingham, 1907
Brachmia fiscinata Meyrick, 1918
Brachmia fuscogramma Janse, 1960
Brachmia graphicodes Meyrick, 1914
Brachmia malacogramma Meyrick, 1909
Brachmia musicopa Meyrick, 1908
Brachmia pantheropa Meyrick, 1913
Brachmia septella (Zeller, 1852)
Brachmia spilopis Meyrick, 1927
Brachmia velitaris Meyrick, 1913
Brachmia verberata Meyrick, 1911
Bucolarcha geodes Meyrick, 1929
Calliphylla retusa Janse, 1963
Capnosema celidota Janse, 1958
Catelaphris torrefacta (Meyrick, 1914)
Cerofrontia griseotincta Janse, 1951
Chrysoesthia isocharis (Vári, 1963)
Chrysoesthia mimetis (Vári, 1963)
Chrysoesthia stipelloides (Janse, 1950)
Clepsimorpha inconspicua Janse, 1960
Cymatoplicella aestuosa (Meyrick, 1913)
Cymatoplicella aplectodes (Janse, 1960)
Dactylethrella chionitis (Meyrick, 1910)
Dactylethrella siccifolii (Walsingham, 1881)
Dactylethrella tetrametra (Meyrick, 1913)
Daemonarcha amblopis Janse, 1954
Daemonarcha atactodes Janse, 1954
Daemonarcha cyprophanes Meyrick, 1918
Daemonarcha hamata Janse, 1954
Daemonarcha heterobela Janse, 1954
Daemonarcha oncera Janse, 1954
Deltolophos haplopa Janse, 1960
Deltophora diversella Sattler, 1979
Deltophora typica Sattler, 1979
Dichomeris antizyga Meyrick, 1913
Dichomeris argentaria Meyrick, 1913
Dichomeris basistriata (Walsingham, 1897)
Dichomeris cotifera Meyrick, 1913
Dichomeris exsecta Meyrick, 1927
Dichomeris fruitans Meyrick, 1920
Dichomeris impigra Meyrick, 1913
Dichomeris meridionella (Walsingham, 1891)
Dichomeris metrodes Meyrick, 1913
Dichomeris oleata Meyrick, 1913
Dichomeris stasimopa Meyrick, 1937
Dichomeris stromatias Meyrick, 1918
Dichomeris ventosa Meyrick, 1913
Dichomeris xanthodeta Meyrick, 1913
Dicranucha albicincta (Meyrick, 1921)
Dicranucha dicksoni Janse, 1963
Dicranucha homochroma Janse, 1954
Dicranucha ochrostoma (Meyrick, 1913)
Dicranucha serialis (Meyrick, 1908)
Dicranucha sterictis (Meyrick, 1908)
Dicranucha strepsigramma (Meyrick, 1937)
Encentrotis catagrapha Meyrick, 1921
Encolpotis argyrophanes Meyrick, 1937
Encolpotis xanthoria Meyrick, 1909
Ephysteris aellographa Janse, 1960
Ephysteris fuscocrossa Janse, 1960
Ephysteris infirma (Meyrick, 1912)
Ephysteris neosirota (Janse, 1950)
Ephysteris ornata (Janse, 1950)
Ephysteris parasynecta Janse, 1963
Ephysteris promptella (Staudinger, 1859)
Ephysteris sirota (Meyrick, 1908)
Eporgastis conclusa (Meyrick, 1918)
Ereboscaeas amorpha Meyrick, 1937
Erikssonella permagna (Meyrick, 1920)
Euryctista hobohmi Janse, 1963
Filisignella cirrhaea (Meyrick, 1914)
Flexiptera revoluta (Meyrick, 1918)
Frumenta nephelomicta Meyrick, 1930
Furcaphora caelata (Meyrick, 1913)
Gambrostola imposita Meyrick, 1926
Gelechia abjunctella Walker, 1864
Gelechia aglossella Walker, 1866
Gelechia anagramma Meyrick, 1921
Gelechia arotrias Meyrick, 1908
Gelechia chionomima Meyrick, 1929
Gelechia epiphloea Meyrick, 1913
Gelechia fecunda Meyrick, 1918
Gelechia flavipalpella Walsingham, 1881
Gelechia liberata Meyrick, 1910
Gelechia omphalopis Meyrick, 1926
Gelechia rescissella Zeller, 1852
Gelechia resecta Meyrick, 1913
Gelechia sematica (Meyrick, 1913)
Gelechia tetraleuca Meyrick, 1918
Gnosimacha catericta Meyrick, 1927
Grandipalpa robusta Janse, 1951
Haplovalva ametris (Meyrick, 1921)
Hedma maculata Povolný, 1978
Hedma microcasis (Meyrick, 1929)
Hedma rhamnifoliae (Amsel & Hering, 1931)
Holaxyra acuta (Meyrick, 1927)
Holaxyra ithyaula (Meyrick, 1926)
Holaxyra picrophanes (Meyrick, 1913)
Hypatima albogrisea (Walsingham, 1881)
Hypatima austerodes (Meyrick, 1918)
Hypatima binummulata (Meyrick, 1929)
Hypatima dissidens (Meyrick, 1913)
Hypatima formidolosa (Meyrick, 1916)
Hypatima improba (Meyrick, 1913)
Hypatima lecticata (Meyrick, 1926)
Hypatima loxosaris (Meyrick, 1918)
Hypatima mancipata (Meyrick, 1913)
Hypatima melanecta (Meyrick, 1914)
Hypatima nigrogrisea Janse, 1949
Hypatima probolaea (Meyrick, 1913)
Hypatima solutrix (Meyrick, 1911)
Hypatima stasimodes (Meyrick, 1931)
Hypatima tetraptila (Meyrick, 1909)
Hypatima triannulata (Meyrick, 1911)
Iochares festa Meyrick, 1921
Iochares straminis (Walsingham, 1881)
Ischnocraspedus peracuta (Meyrick, 1920)
Ischnophylla similicolor Janse, 1963
Lacharissa tanyzancla Meyrick, 1937
Lachnostola amphizeucta Meyrick, 1918
Lacistodes brunneostola Janse, 1960
Lacistodes tauropis Meyrick, 1921
Lanceopenna pentastigma Janse, 1960
Lanceopenna prominula (Meyrick, 1913)
Lanceopenna pseudogaleotis Janse, 1950
Lanceoptera panochra Janse, 1960
Lasiarchis hirsuta Janse, 1958
Lasiarchis pycnodes (Meyrick, 1909)
Leucophylla nigribasis Janse, 1960
Leuronoma chlorotoma Meyrick, 1918
Leuronoma eodryas (Meyrick, 1918)
Leuronoma magna Janse, 1958
Leuronoma nigridorsis Meyrick, 1921
Leuronoma textifera (Meyrick, 1913)
Leuronoma veterascens Meyrick, 1918
Leuronoma zymotis (Meyrick, 1909)
Leuropalpa reducta (Janse, 1951)
Machlotricha griseostola Janse, 1960
Machlotricha latipalpis (Walsingham, 1881)
Macrocalcara sporima Janse, 1960
Megacraspedus serica Meyrick, 1909
Melitoxoides cophias (Meyrick, 1913)
Melitoxoides glauca Janse, 1960
Melitoxoides leucodoxa (Meyrick, 1920)
Melitoxoides panaula (Meyrick, 1909)
Metatactis griseobrunnea Janse, 1949
Metzneria acrena (Meyrick, 1908)
Metzneria heptacentra Meyrick, 1911
Microcraspedus brachypogon (Meyrick, 1937)
Microcraspedus eremaula (Janse, 1960)
Microcraspedus photinopa (Meyrick, 1925)
Microcraspedus synecta (Meyrick, 1909)
Mometa zemiodes Durrant, 1914
Musurga turgida (Meyrick, 1918)
Neopachnistis amblystola Janse, 1954
Neopachnistis parochroma Janse, 1954
Neopachnistis pseudomorpha Janse, 1954
Neopachnistis tephrodes (Meyrick, 1909)
Neopatetris tenuis Janse, 1960
Neotelphusa anisogrisea Janse, 1958
Neotelphusa bimaculata Janse, 1958
Neotelphusa castrigera (Meyrick, 1913)
Neotelphusa cirrhomacula Janse, 1958
Neotelphusa craterota (Meyrick, 1913)
Neotelphusa ferrugilinea Janse, 1958
Neotelphusa flavinotatta Janse, 1958
Neotelphusa fuscisparsa Janse, 1958
Neotelphusa limenaea (Meyrick, 1920)
Neotelphusa obliquifascia Janse, 1960
Neotelphusa ochrophthalma (Meyrick, 1927)
Neotelphusa pallidistola Janse, 1958
Neotelphusa phaeomacula Janse, 1958
Neotelphusa similella Janse, 1958
Neotelphusa tapinota Janse, 1958
Ochrodia pentamacula (Janse, 1958)
Ochrodia subdiminutella (Stainton, 1867)
Octonodula inumbrata (Meyrick, 1914)
Onebala brunneotincta Janse, 1954
Onebala obsoleta Janse, 1954
Onebala probolaspis Meyrick, 1929
Onebala semiluna Janse, 1954
Onebala zulu (Walsingham, 1881)
Ornativalva kalahariensis (Janse, 1960)
Panicotricha prographa Meyrick, 1913
Parabola butyraula (Meyrick, 1913)
Parabrachmia anomala Janse, 1960
Parabrachmia trisignella Janse, 1960
Parallactis panchlora (Meyrick, 1911)
Parallactis plaesiodes (Meyrick, 1920)
Parallactis zorophanes Janse, 1954
Parapsectris carinata (Meyrick, 1911)
Parapsectris exstincta (Meyrick, 1911)
Parapsectris fastidiosa Meyrick, 1911
Parapsectris ferax (Meyrick, 1913)
Parapsectris feraxoides Bidzilya, 2010
Parapsectris ferulata Meyrick, 1918
Parapsectris lacunosa (Meyrick, 1918)
Parapsectris ochrocosma (Meyrick, 1911)
Parapsectris opaula (Meyrick, 1911)
Parapsectris tholaea Meyrick, 1911
Paraselotis pelochroa Janse, 1960
Paratelphusa griseoptera Janse, 1958
Parathectis farinata (Meyrick, 1913)
Parathectis sordidula (Meyrick, 1913)
Paristhmia barathrodes Meyrick, 1909
Pectinophora gossypiella (Saunders, 1844)
Phanerophalla knysnaensis Janse, 1960
Photodotis abachausi Janse, 1958
Photodotis pellochroa Janse, 1960
Photodotis prochalina Meyrick, 1911
Photodotis spilodoma Meyrick, 1918
Phthoracma blanda Meyrick, 1921
Phthorimaea operculella (Zeller, 1873)
Picroptera aulotoma (Meyrick, 1917)
Picroptera orthacma (Meyrick, 1926)
Pithanurga chariphila Meyrick, 1921
Platyphalla ochrinotata Janse, 1951
Polyhymno blastophora Janse, 1950
Polyhymno centrophora (Meyrick, 1921)
Polyhymno chionarcha Meyrick, 1913
Polyhymno deuteraula Meyrick, 1914
Polyhymno erratica Janse, 1950
Polyhymno eurydoxa Meyrick, 1909
Polyhymno furcatella Janse, 1950
Polyhymno hieracitis Meyrick, 1913
Polyhymno hostilis Meyrick, 1918
Polyhymno inermis Meyrick, 1913
Polyhymno intorta Meyrick, 1918
Polyhymno intortoides Janse, 1950
Polyhymno lignicolor Janse, 1950
Polyhymno multifida Meyrick, 1917
Polyhymno oxystola Meyrick, 1913
Polyhymno palinorsa Meyrick, 1909
Polyhymno paracma Meyrick, 1909
Polyhymno pausimacha Meyrick, 1909
Polyhymno pernitida Janse, 1950
Polyhymno pleuracma Meyrick, 1926
Polyhymno tetragrapha Meyrick, 1913
Polyhymno thinoclasta Meyrick, 1926
Polyhymno tropaea Meyrick, 1908
Polyhymno walsinghami Janse, 1950
Proselotis strictula (Meyrick, 1937)
Pseudotelphusa albisignata Janse, 1960
Pseudotelphusa albopasta Janse, 1960
Pseudotelphusa confixa (Meyrick, 1918)
Pseudotelphusa cycota (Meyrick, 1911)
Pseudotelphusa devia (Meyrick, 1913)
Pseudotelphusa griseotincta Janse, 1958
Pseudotelphusa oxychasta (Meyrick, 1929)
Pseudotelphusa paracycota Janse, 1958
Pseudotelphusa probata (Meyrick, 1909)
Pseudotelphusa tornimacula Janse, 1958
Pseudotelphusa trinephela (Meyrick, 1929)
Ptychovalva obruta (Meyrick, 1921)
Ptychovalva trigella (Zeller, 1852)
Ptychovalva trimaculata Janse, 1960
Pycnodytis erebaula Meyrick, 1918
Pyncostola abnormalis Janse, 1950
Pyncostola albicolorella Janse, 1950
Pyncostola alloea Janse, 1950
Pyncostola auturga Meyrick, 1921
Pyncostola celeris Meyrick, 1920
Pyncostola crateraula Meyrick, 1918
Pyncostola dicksoni Janse, 1956
Pyncostola flavostriga Janse, 1950
Pyncostola fusca Janse, 1950
Pyncostola fuscofasciata Janse, 1950
Pyncostola hiberna (Meyrick, 1912)
Pyncostola illuminata (Meyrick, 1913)
Pyncostola invida (Meyrick, 1911)
Pyncostola iospila (Meyrick, 1909)
Pyncostola lacteata Janse, 1950
Pyncostola magnanima (Meyrick, 1912)
Pyncostola melanatracta (Meyrick, 1910)
Pyncostola merista Meyrick, 1918
Pyncostola monophanes Janse, 1960
Pyncostola nigrinotata Janse, 1950
Pyncostola ochraula Meyrick, 1918
Pyncostola oeconomica Meyrick, 1920
Pyncostola operosa (Meyrick, 1909)
Pyncostola pachyacma Meyrick, 1926
Pyncostola pammacha (Meyrick, 1913)
Pyncostola pentacentra (Meyrick, 1912)
Pyncostola perlustrata Meyrick, 1920
Pyncostola powelli Janse, 1950
Pyncostola semnochroa (Meyrick, 1913)
Pyncostola suffusellus (Walsingham, 1891)
Pyncostola tanylopha Janse, 1960
Pyncostola variegata Janse, 1950
Pyncostola veronica Janse, 1950
Pyncostola xanthomacula Janse, 1963
Rotundivalva blanda Janse, 1951
Schematistis analoxa Meyrick, 1911
Schistovalva trachyptera Janse, 1960
Schizovalva ablepta Janse, 1960
Schizovalva adelosema Janse, 1960
Schizovalva alaopis (Meyrick, 1921)
Schizovalva anisofascia Janse, 1960
Schizovalva bistrigata Janse, 1951
Schizovalva brunneotincta Janse, 1951
Schizovalva brunneovesta Janse, 1960
Schizovalva catharodes (Meyrick, 1920)
Schizovalva celidota Janse, 1960
Schizovalva cyrtogramma Janse, 1960
Schizovalva ebenostriga Janse, 1960
Schizovalva epicentra (Meyrick, 1909)
Schizovalva episema Janse, 1960
Schizovalva exoenota Meyrick, 1918
Schizovalva exsulata (Meyrick, 1918)
Schizovalva guillarmodi Janse, 1960
Schizovalva hyperythra (Meyrick, 1921)
Schizovalva isochorda (Meyrick, 1921)
Schizovalva isophanes Janse, 1960
Schizovalva leptochroa Janse, 1960
Schizovalva leucogrisea Janse, 1951
Schizovalva matutina (Meyrick, 1913)
Schizovalva mesacta (Meyrick, 1909)
Schizovalva naufraga (Meyrick, 1911)
Schizovalva nigrifasciata Janse, 1951
Schizovalva nigrosema Janse, 1960
Schizovalva nubila Janse, 1960
Schizovalva ochnias (Meyrick, 1913)
Schizovalva ochrotincta Janse, 1951
Schizovalva ophitis (Meyrick, 1913)
Schizovalva perirrorata Janse, 1951
Schizovalva peronectis (Meyrick, 1909)
Schizovalva polygramma (Meyrick, 1914)
Schizovalva prioleuca (Meyrick, 1911)
Schizovalva rhodochra (Meyrick, 1913)
Schizovalva rubigitincta Janse, 1951
Schizovalva sarcographa (Meyrick, 1917)
Schizovalva stasiarcha (Meyrick, 1913)
Schizovalva trachypalpella Janse, 1960
Schizovalva triplacopis (Meyrick, 1912)
Schizovalva trisignis (Meyrick, 1908)
Schizovalva unitincta Janse, 1960
Schizovalva xerochroa Janse, 1951
Schizovalva xylotincta Janse, 1951
Scrobipalpa aptatella (Walker, 1864)
Scrobipalpa chersophila (Meyrick, 1909)
Scrobipalpa colasta (Meyrick, 1921)
Scrobipalpa concreta (Meyrick, 1914)
Scrobipalpa costimacula Janse, 1960
Scrobipalpa cretigena (Meyrick, 1914)
Scrobipalpa dispensata (Meyrick, 1921)
Scrobipalpa ergasima (Meyrick, 1916)
Scrobipalpa geomicta (Meyrick, 1918)
Scrobipalpa incola (Meyrick, 1912)
Scrobipalpa nomias (Meyrick, 1921)
Scrobipalpa obsoletella (Fischer von Röslerstamm, 1841)
Scrobipalpa ocyphanes (Meyrick, 1937)
Scrobipalpa pendens (Meyrick, 1918)
Scrobipalpa phalacrodes (Meyrick, 1913)
Scrobipalpa phelotris (Meyrick, 1909)
Scrobipalpa triloba Janse, 1960
Scrobipalpa trychnophylla Janse, 1960
Scrobipalpa vicaria (Meyrick, 1921)
Scrobipalpa xylochroa Janse, 1963
Sitotroga cerealella (Olivier, 1789)
Sitotroga psacasta (Meyrick, 1908)
Sophronia aquilex Meyrick, 1926
Stegasta variana Meyrick, 1904
Stomopteryx anxia (Meyrick, 1917)
Stomopteryx circaea (Meyrick, 1911)
Stomopteryx cirrhocoma (Meyrick, 1914)
Stomopteryx credula (Meyrick, 1927)
Stomopteryx difficilis Janse, 1951
Stomopteryx elaeocoma (Meyrick, 1918)
Stomopteryx eremopis (Meyrick, 1921)
Stomopteryx frivola Meyrick, 1926
Stomopteryx officiosa Janse, 1951
Stomopteryx oncodes (Meyrick, 1913)
Stomopteryx pallidipes Janse, 1951
Stomopteryx thoracica (Meyrick, 1911)
Stomopteryx trachyphylla Janse, 1960
Strenophila hyptiota Meyrick, 1913
Symbatica cryphias Meyrick, 1910
Syncopacma consimilis Janse, 1951
Syncopacma lutea Janse, 1960
Syncopacma monochromella Janse, 1951
Syncopacma oxyspila (Meyrick, 1909)
Syncopacma perfuscata Janse, 1951
Syncopacma polychromella (Rebel, 1902)
Syngelechia psimythota (Meyrick, 1913)
Syrmadaula automorpha Meyrick, 1918
Telphusa amphichroma Meyrick, 1913
Telphusa calathaea Meyrick, 1913
Telphusa iosticta Meyrick, 1937
Telphusa iriditis Meyrick, 1920
Telphusa retecta Meyrick, 1921
Thaumaturgis craterocrossa Meyrick, 1934
Thiotricha tenuis (Walsingham, 1891)
Thriophora ovulata Meyrick, 1911
Thymosopha antileuca Meyrick, 1914
Trichotaphe amblychroa Janse, 1954
Trichotaphe byrsoxantha Meyrick, 1918
Trichotaphe claviculata Meyrick, 1909
Trichotaphe coenulenta (Meyrick, 1927)
Trichotaphe condylotes Meyrick, 1921
Trichotaphe dysnotata Janse, 1954
Trichotaphe excepta (Meyrick, 1914)
Trichotaphe externella (Zeller, 1852)
Trichotaphe famosa Meyrick, 1914
Trichotaphe furvellus (Zeller, 1852)
Trichotaphe hortulana Meyrick, 1918
Trichotaphe inclusa (Meyrick, 1927)
Trichotaphe introspiciens Meyrick, 1926
Trichotaphe ironica Meyrick, 1909
Trichotaphe ligyra Meyrick, 1913
Trichotaphe molybdea Janse, 1954
Trichotaphe ochroxesta Meyrick, 1921
Trichotaphe oenombra Meyrick, 1914
Trichotaphe opsorrhoa Meyrick, 1929
Trichotaphe oxygrapha Meyrick, 1913
Trichotaphe physeta Meyrick, 1913
Trichotaphe pleuropa Meyrick, 1921
Trichotaphe plumbosa Meyrick, 1913
Trichotaphe pyrrhitis Meyrick, 1911
Trichotaphe quadrifurcata Janse, 1954
Trichotaphe rubidula Meyrick, 1913
Trichotaphe skukuzae Janse, 1954
Trichotaphe subiridescens Janse, 1954
Trichotaphe tapinostola Janse, 1954
Trichotaphe tridentata Janse, 1954
Tricyanaula metallica (Walsingham, 1891)
Trychnopalpa fornacaria (Meyrick, 1913)
Zalithia deltophora Janse, 1954
Zalithia octophora (Meyrick, 1918)
Zalithia xanthophylla Janse, 1963

Gelechiidae